Angus Cameron may refer to:

 Angus Cameron (American politician) (1826–1897), American politician, U.S. Senator from Wisconsin
 Angus Cameron (Australian politician) (1847–1896), New South Wales politician
 Angus Cameron (colonial administrator) (1871–1961), British colonial administrator
 Angus Cameron (publisher) (1908–2002), American book editor and publisher
 Angus Cameron (ice hockey) (1921–1993), Canadian ice hockey player
 Angus Cameron (rugby union) (1929–1991), Scottish rugby union player
 Angus Cameron (academic) (1941–1983), Canadian academic
 Angus Cameron (director) (born 1964), British director
 Angus Ewan Cameron (1906–1981), American chemist